San Antonio Independent School District is a school district based in San Antonio, Texas, United States.

San Antonio ISD ranks is the 13th largest of Texas' 1,057 school districts. The District encompasses 79 square miles with a total population of 306,943 (2010 U.S. Census). San Antonio ISD serves the Downtown, Midtown, and inner city areas of the city of San Antonio and a small portion of the city of Balcones Heights. With over 48,720 students (as of 2018), the district is the third largest school district in the Bexar County area.

Superintendents

1875-????, C. Plagge

1919-1923, Annie Webb Blanton

1946-1963, Thomas B. Portwood

1994-1998, Dr. Diana Lam

1998-1999, Dr. David F. Splitek (Interim)

1999-2006, Dr. Rubén D. Olivárez

2006-2012, Dr. Robert Duron

2012-2015, Dr. Sylvester Perez (Interim/Permanent)

2015–2021, Pedro Martinez

2021-(Interim) Dr. Robert A. Jaklich

Board of Trustees
2010-11
President, James Howard
Vice-President, Carlos Villarreal
Secretary, Thomas C. Lopez
Asst. Secretary, Olga Hernandez
Member, Ruben D. Cuero
Member, Adela R. Segovia
Member, Ed Garza

2011-12
President, James Howard
Vice-President, Carlos Villarreal
Secretary, Adela R. Segovia
Asst. Secretary, Olga Hernandez
Member, Ruben D. Cuero
Member, Ed Garza
Member, Patti Radle

2012-13
President, Ed Garza
Vice-President, Ruben D. Cuero
Secretary, Olga Hernandez
Asst. Secretary, Adela R. Segovia
Member, Debra Guerrero
Member, James Howard
Member, Patti Radle

2013-14
President, Ed Garza
Vice-President, Olga Hernandez
Secretary, Arthur V. Valdez
Asst. Secretary, James Howard
Member, Debra Guerrero
Member, Steve Lecholop
Member, Patti Radle

2019-20
President, Patti Radle
Vice-President, Arthur V. Valdez
Secretary, Debra Guerrero
Asst. Secretary, Steve Lecholop
Member, Alicia M. Perry
Member, Christina Martinez
Member, Ed Garza

2021-22
President, Christina Martinez
Vice-President, Alicia Sebastian
Secretary, Arthur V. Valdez
Member, Sarah Sorensen
Member, Leticia Ozuna
Member, Patti Radle
Member, Ed Garza

History
While San Antonio public schools were established by the City Council in 1854, it wasn't until May 2, 1899, that the school system became an independent district with the formation of its own Board of Trustees. San Antonio ISD received its first charter from the state of Texas in 1903.

One of San Antonio's most outstanding assets is the preservation of its historic sites and neighborhoods, most of which are found within SAISD. All have strong, active neighborhood associations.

SAISD is the tenth-largest public employer in San Antonio, with more than 7,000 employees serving about 49,000 students. The District’s resources consist of local, state, and federal revenue.

Local revenue consists primarily of property taxes and also includes local grant donations. State revenue accounts for the District’s largest share of revenue and is mainly driven by Average Daily Attendance (ADA) and the District’s total property value. Federal revenue is a minor component of the operating budget but the major source of revenue for the Food Service Fund and is driven by the number of meals served and the number of students who qualify for the free- and reduced-price lunch program.

In January 2016, Superintendent Pedro Martinez unveiled the SAISD Blueprint for Excellence: Target 2020, a five-year plan with 10 academic goals. The plan is supported by five pillars: Academic Excellence, Talent Management, Culture Shift, Stakeholder Engagement and Fiscal Management. The blueprint was developed with a long-term perspective and inclusive of the input of external institutions and organizations, as well as internal feedback.

The District set in motion the strategies outlined in the plan, and began to see a continued upward trajectory with strong gains in academic achievement. SAISD received an overall grade of a "B" rating through the accountability ratings from the Texas Education Agency for the 2018-2019 school year. This rating measures how well the District prepared students for success, both in school and after high school in college, a career, or the military.

The District was involved directly in the San Antonio Independent School District v. Rodriguez Supreme Court case and indirectly in the United States v. Lopez Supreme Court case.

In the 2016-2017 school year, about 5,050 students went from SAISD to charter schools, and in the last part of the 2017-2018 school year that number increased to about 10,100, while about 200 students living in SAISD were in other school districts. For the 2018-2019 school year the district ended the employment of 132 teachers over budget cuts, and budget was reduced by 6%, totaling $31 million. By 2018, in a response to a decline in enrollment, the district repurposed several campuses as magnet schools or specialty schools to attract parents who would otherwise put their children in private school.

Demographics

 91% of the students are considered low income. As of that year, people transferring from other school districts to SAISD tended to live in more upscale communities.

School uniforms
All San Antonio ISD students are required to wear school uniforms. Students are required to wear white collared shirts and khaki bottoms. They are also permitted to wear polo shirts with their schools' colors. The Texas Education Agency specifies that the parents and/or guardians of students zoned to a school with uniforms may apply for a waiver to opt out of the uniform policy so their children do not have to wear the uniform; parents must specify "bona fide" reasons, such as religious reasons or philosophical objections.

Schools

High schools

G.W. Brackenridge High School
Brackenridge won the 1947 UIL state football championship, the last title before the UIL divided schools into classifications based on enrollment.
Luther Burbank High School
Center for Applied Science & Technology (CAST Tech) High School
The school, designed by H-E-B CEO Charles Butt and inspired by the High Tech High charter schools system, opened with the ninth grade in fall 2017. Its initial enrollment was 175.
Thomas Edison High School
Fox Technical High School
Highlands High School
Sam Houston High School
Thomas Jefferson High School
Sidney Lanier High School
Phoenix Middle College (10-12)
St. Philip's Early College High School
Travis Early College High School

Middle schools
S.J. Davis Middle School
Joel C. Harris Middle School
Washington Irving Dual Language Academy
Henry Wadsworth Longfellow Middle School
James Russell Lowell Middle School
Thomas Nelson Page Middle School
Edgar Allan Poe Middle School
Jerimiah Rhodes Middle School
Harry H. Rogers Middle School
Fidel L. Tafolla Middle School
John Greenleaf Whittier Middle School

Academies

Advanced Learning Academy at Fox Tech (PK-12)
Charles Clyde Ball Academy (PK-7)
Beacon Hill Academy (PK-7)
James Bonham Academy (K-8)
Bowden Academy - As per a 2016 bond it is scheduled to get a $11.1 million refurbishment. Brian Sparks, in 2018, served as principal at both Bowden and Lamar Elementary, and he was making efforts to improve Bowden's performance levels to that of Lamar's. As of 2018 a significant number of parents zoned to Bowden instead send their children to other schools, public and private. Most people residing in the area are of a lower socioeconomic strata although by 2018 gentrification of the area began. Aliyya Swaby and Alexa Ura of Texas Tribune, in 2018, described it as "drab and dimly lit" and that it "is still struggling".
Agnes Cotton Academy (PK-8)
David Crockett Academy (PK-7)
Frederick Douglass Academy (PK-7)
Marin B. Fenwick Academy (PK-7)
Muriel Vance Forbes Academy (PK-7)
Inez Foster Academy (PK-7)
Robert B. Green Academy (K-8)
Nathaniel Hawthorne Academy (K-8)
Ferdinand Herff Academy (PK-7)
Irving Dual Language Academy (PK-2)
Eloise Japhet Academy (PK-7)
Martin Luther King Jr. Academy (K-8)
Antonio Margil Academy (PK-7)
Mission Academy (PK-8)
Ira C. Ogden Academy (PK-7)
Laura Steele Montessori Academy (PK-1)
Mark Twain Dual Language Academy (PK-3)
Riverside Park Academy (PK-7)
Will Rogers Academy (PK-7)
Woodlawn Academy (K-8)
Young Men's Leadership Academy (4-9)
Young Women's Leadership Academy (6-12)
YWLA was ranked #1 in Texas (2012-2013)
The school, as of December 2016 also ranked as exemplary by the Texas Education Agency, has a college readiness focus with an emphasis on science, technology, engineering and math.

Elementary schools
Charles August Arnold Elementary School
Barkley-Ruiz Elementary School
Mildred Baskin Elementary School
J.T. Brackenridge Elementary School
Andrew Briscoe Elementary School
Bella Cameron Elementary School
Collins Garden Elementary School
Lorenzo De Zavala Elementary School
Frederick Douglass Elementary School
Marin B. Fenwick Elementary School
Benjamin Franklin Elementary School
Samuel Houston Gates Elementary School
Charles Graebner Elementary School
Highland Hills Elementary School
Highland Park Elementary School
Hillcrest Elementary School
Herman Hirsch Elementary School
Mary Huppertz Elementary School
George E. Kelly Elementary School
Sarah King Elementary School
Mirabeau B. Lamar Elementary School -  the student body was majority Hispanic but the school's attendance area was experiencing gentrification. The school has a dual English-Spanish program. Sparks, also principal at Bowden Academy, served as principal of Lamar since circa 2013 That year Swaby and Ura stated that "Over the last five years, Sparks has made Lamar a winner with the help of an engaged corps of parents".
James Madison Elementary School
Samuel A. Maverick Elementary School
Dorie Miller Elementary School
Elma A. Neal Elementary School
John J. Pershing Elementary School
Cleto L. Rodriguez Montessori Elementary School
Kate Schenck Elementary School
Smith Elementary School
P.F. Stewart Elementary School
Ollie Perry Storm Elementary School
Booker T. Washington Elementary School
Woodrow Wilson Elementary School
Woodlawn Hills Elementary School

Early childhood education centers
 Henry Carroll Early Childhood Education Center 
 Esther Perez Carvajal Early Childhood Education Center
 Rafael Gonzales Early Childhood Education Center
 Wilbur J. Knox Early Childhood Education Center
 Pauline Nelson Early Childhood Education Center
 Elizabeth Tynan Early Childhood Education Center

Special campuses
Cooper Academy at Navarro (9-12)
Estrada Alternative Center (7-12)
Brewer Academy (6-12)

See also

List of school districts in Texas

References

External links
 

School districts in San Antonio
School districts in Bexar County, Texas